Bass Reeves is an upcoming Western created by Taylor Sheridan. It is based on the life of the first black deputy U.S. marshal Bass Reeves, and is also the fourth installment into the Yellowstone franchise.

Cast
 David Oyelowo as Bass Reeves: A federal peace officer in the Indian Territory, capturing over 3,000 of the most dangerous criminals without ever being wounded.
 Dennis Quaid as Sherrill Lynn: A Deputy U.S. Marshall
 Forrest Goodluck as Billy Crow: A young Cherokee man with an affinity for dime store books and gaudy style.
 Lauren E. Banks as Jennie Reeves: Bass' wife
 Barry Pepper as Esau Pierce: The leader of the 1st Cherokee Mounted Rifles
 Grantham Coleman as Edwin Jones: An extremely persuasive man who has a clear vision and a promise for the future, to those who will listen.
 Demi Singleton as Sally Reeves: Bass' daughter
 Garrett Hedlund as Garrett Montgomery: A posse man of the era who Bass hires for his riding know-how and expertise of the area

Production
It was announced in September 2021 that Taylor Sheridan was developing a television series based on Reeves, with David Oyelowo set to star in the role. In May 2022, the series was set at Paramount+ and was temporarily renamed 1883: The Bass Reeves Story; it was now described as serving as an offshoot to the series 1883, itself a prequel to Yellowstone. In June, Oyelowo revealed Sheridan was set to direct the pilot episode for the series. Dennis Quaid would join the cast in January 2023. The show will be heavily based on the first two books of The Bass Reeves Trilogy by Sidney Thompson: Follow the Angels, Follow the Doves and Hell on the Border

Filming for the series was expected to begin in Fort Worth, Texas in October 2022. In January 2023, Quaid stated he had begun filming for the series. Forrest Goodluck, Lauren E. Banks and Barry Pepper would be cast in February, with Grantham Coleman and Demi Singleton added the following month. Garrett Hedlund was also cast.

References

External links
Bass Reeves at the Internet Movie Database

English-language television shows
2020s American drama television series
2020s Western (genre) television series
American prequel television series
Paramount+ original programming
Television series created by Taylor Sheridan
Television series set in the 1880s
Television shows filmed in Texas
Television shows set in Fort Worth, Texas
Upcoming drama television series